Rearrange may refer to:

Rearrange EP, a 1998 promotional EP released by God Lives Underwater, and their second EP album
"Rearrange" (God Lives Underwater song), 1998
"Rearrange" (Miles Kane song), 2011